Veleropilina seisuimaruae is a species of monoplacophoran, a superficially limpet-like marine mollusc. A single specimen was found off the coast of Shima Peninsula of Honshu, Japan in 2009.

References

Monoplacophora
Molluscs described in 2012